was a Sōtō Zen monk who trained under both Sōtō and Rinzai teachers and became known for his teaching combining methods from both schools.

Biography 
Born in an area known today as Obama, Fukui Prefecture, he entered a Sōtō temple as a novice at age 7 and continued training in temples during his primary and high school years. At age 20 he entered Shogen-ji, a well-known Rinzai monastery; it is reported that he experienced kensho after two and half years there. In 1901 he graduated from Komazawa University (then Sōtō-shu Daigakurin), the Sōtō university.  He eventually studied under various Sōtō and Rinzai masters such as Harada Sodo Kakusho, Oka Sotan, Akino Kodo, Adachi Tatsujun, Hoshimi Tenkai, Unmuken Taigi Sogon, and Kogenshitsu Dokutan Sosan. From the years of 1911 to 1923, Harada held a professor position at Soto-shu Daigakurin. A very strict disciplinarian, he served as abbot at various Sōtō temples throughout Japan: Hosshin-ji, Chisai-in, Bukkoku-ji, Sōji-ji and Chigen-ji.  Until almost age 90, he conducted week-long sesshin at Hosshin-ji 6 times a year; he also held sesshin elsewhere.

Harada Roshi's teaching integrated the Rinzai use of Kōan, a practice which was abolished in the Sōtō-school in the 19th century under influence of Gento Sokuchu (1729–1807). He also departed from the Sōtō conventions of his day by training lay persons with monks rather than separately.

A well-known heir in the West is Hakuun Yasutani Rōshi, a Sōtō monk who he also trained in koan study. This led ultimately to the spread of combined Sōtō and Rinzai methods by the Sanbo Kyodan, a new Zen sect founded by Yasutani which became influential in the West. Harada himself, however, remained within the Sōtō sect. It is often claimed in the West that he received Rinzai inka shomei (dharma transmission) from Dokutan Rōshi. Harada Rōshi may be viewed as an eclectically talented Sōtō teacher who did not abide by sectarian boundaries in regard to practice method.

Criticism
Harada has been criticized for his support of the Japanese War-endeavors. A famous quote from Harada, cited in Zen at War, is:

Dharma heirs
Dharma-heirs from Harada Roshi are:
 Hakuun Yasutani Rōshi, founder of Sanbo Kyodan
 Harada Tangen Rōshi Head of Bukkoku-ji temple; 
 Ban Tetsugyu Soin Rōshi, Head of Tosho-ji temple in Tokyo; 
 Watanabe Genshu, Head of Soji-ji temple among others.

See also
 Buddhism in Japan

References

Sources

External links
 Sanbo Kyodan teachers and heirs Sanbo Kyodan: Harada-Yasutani School of Zen at the WWW Virtual library (Edited by Dr T. Matthew Ciolek)

Komazawa University alumni
Zen Buddhist abbots
Soto Zen Buddhists
Rinzai Buddhists
Japanese Buddhist clergy
Japanese Zen Buddhists
1871 births
1961 deaths
People from Fukui Prefecture
People from Obama, Fukui